Lennart Damsbo-Andersen (born 5 October 1956 in Ovsted Parish near Skanderborg) is a Danish politician, who is a member of the Folketing for the Social Democrats political party. He was elected into parliament at the 2007 Danish general election.

Political career
Damsbo-Andersen's political career began with local politics. He was in the municipal council of Nysted Municipality from 1993 until the municipality was merged with five other municipalities to form Guldborgsund Municipality in 2006. He was a member of the new municipality from 2006 to 2007. From 2002 to 2006 he was the mayor of Nysted Municipality.

Damsbo-Andersen first ran for parliament in the 2007 general election, where he was elected with 5,731 votes. He was reelected in 2011 with 6,662 votes, in 2015 with 5,902 votes and in 2019 with 5,648 votes.

External links 
 Biography on the website of the Danish Parliament (Folketinget)

References 

Living people
1956 births
People from Skanderborg Municipality
Social Democrats (Denmark) politicians
Danish municipal councillors
Mayors of places in Denmark
Members of the Folketing 2007–2011
Members of the Folketing 2011–2015
Members of the Folketing 2015–2019
Members of the Folketing 2019–2022